Peponocranium is a genus of dwarf spiders that was first described by Eugène Louis Simon in 1884.

Species
 it contains five species, found in Europe:
Peponocranium dubium Wunderlich, 1995 – Mongolia
Peponocranium ludicrum (O. Pickard-Cambridge, 1861) (type) – Europe, Russia
Peponocranium orbiculatum (O. Pickard-Cambridge, 1882) – Germany to Russia, Georgia
Peponocranium praeceps Miller, 1943 – Finland, Germany to Russia, Ukraine
Peponocranium simile Tullgren, 1955 – Sweden

See also
 List of Linyphiidae species (I–P)

References

Araneomorphae genera
Linyphiidae
Spiders of Asia
Spiders of Europe